The 2005 Chennai Open was an ATP tennis tournament held in Chennai, India. The tournament was held from 3 to 10 January.

Finals

Singles

 Carlos Moyà defeated  Paradorn Srichaphan 3–6, 6–4, 7–6(7–5)
 It was Moyà's only title of the year and the 18th of his career.

Doubles

 Rainer Schüttler/  Yen-Hsun Lu defeated  Mahesh Bhupathi /  Jonas Björkman 7–5, 4–6, 7–6(7–4)
 It was Schüttler's only title of the year and the 6th of his career. It was Lu's only title of the year and the 1st of his career.

References

External links
 ATP tournament profile

 
Chennai Open
2005 in Indian tennis
Chennai Open